Copulabyssia leptalea is a species of sea snail, a marine gastropod mollusk in the family Pseudococculinidae.

Description
The shell grows to a size of 4 mm.

Distribution 
This marine species occurs in the Atlantic Ocean from New Jersey to East Florida, USA, at depths between 530 m and 3800 m.

Description 
The maximum recorded shell length is 4 mm.

Habitat 
Minimum recorded depth is 534 m. Maximum recorded depth is 3834 m.

References 

Pseudococculinidae
Gastropods described in 1884